The 2020 season was the Los Angeles Chargers' 51st in the National Football League (NFL), their 61st overall, their fifth in the Greater Los Angeles Area, and their fourth and final season under head coach Anthony Lynn. It also marks the Chargers' first season playing their home games at SoFi Stadium in Inglewood (which the team shares with the Los Angeles Rams), after using Dignity Health Sports Park in Carson as their temporary home stadium for the previous three seasons. This is also the Chargers' first season since 2007 with new uniforms, which were unveiled on April 21, 2020. The uniforms are somewhat similar in design to the ones they donned in their inaugural season in 1960.

After mutually agreeing to part ways, this was the first season since 2003 without quarterback Philip Rivers on the roster and the first since 2005 without Rivers as the starting quarterback. Rivers led the Chargers to six playoff appearances, starting every game since September 11, 2006. Backup quarterback Tyrod Taylor was named starter, but following a medical mishap prior to week 2, he was replaced by rookie Justin Herbert. After a 45–0 loss to the New England Patriots in Week 13, the Chargers were mathematically eliminated from playoff contention for the second consecutive year. However, despite this, the Chargers rallied and won their last four games, bringing their record to 7–9, improving on their 5–11 season from the previous year.

At the conclusion of the 2020 season, the organization announced that Lynn was fired as head coach. This season was highlighted by a string of blown 4th quarter leads. 8 of their 9 losses were by a deficit of 10 points or less. Despite the disappointing season, quarterback Justin Herbert was named AP Offensive Rookie of the Year.

Offseason

Signings

Departures

Draft

Undrafted free agents

Despite signing a plethora of UDFAs (undrafted free agents), all were released during the initial roster cuts.

Staff

Final roster

Preseason
The Chargers' preseason schedule was announced on May 7, but was later cancelled due to the COVID-19 pandemic.

Regular season

Schedule
The Chargers' 2020 schedule was announced on May 7.

Note: Intra-division opponents are in bold text.

Game summaries

Week 1: at Cincinnati Bengals

Week 2: vs. Kansas City Chiefs

Justin Herbert made an unexpected start after Taylor suffered an injury before the game.

Week 3: vs. Carolina Panthers

Week 4: at Tampa Bay Buccaneers

Week 5: at New Orleans Saints
The Chargers face Drew Brees and the Saints for the fourth time. The Saints trailed earlier and made comeback attempts. At the conclusion of the fourth quarter, Michael Badgley attempted a game-winning field goal, but the ball hits the upright, resulting in both teams tying and going into overtime. Wil Lutz kicked a 36-yard field goal and the game continued. When Rookie quarterback, Justin Herbert, elected a 4th down conversion, his pass was completed, but Marshon Lattimore and Demario Davis stopped the Chargers from getting a 1st down, resulting in a Chargers' loss.

Week 7: vs. Jacksonville Jaguars

Week 8: at Denver Broncos

Week 9: vs. Las Vegas Raiders

Week 10: at Miami Dolphins

Week 11: vs. New York Jets

Week 12: at Buffalo Bills

Week 13: vs. New England Patriots

With the shutout loss against New England, Los Angeles fell to 3–9 and was mathematically eliminated from playoff contention.

Week 14: vs. Atlanta Falcons

Week 15: at Las Vegas Raiders

Week 16: vs. Denver Broncos

Week 17: at Kansas City Chiefs

Standings

Division

Conference

Notes

References

External links
 

Los Angeles Chargers
Los Angeles Chargers seasons
Los Angeles Chargers
Chargers